The following bus routes are operated in Nassau County, New York. Most of these routes are operated under Nassau Inter-County Express (NICE), formerly MTA Long Island Bus, except in Greater Long Beach, where that city operates its own bus service through Long Beach Bus. Some of them are the direct descendants of streetcar lines (see List of streetcar lines on Long Island and in Queens), and most were previously privately operated prior to 1973. These routes are designated on the buses, bus stop signs, and timetables with a lowercase "n". Previously, the routes were designated with an uppercase "N", akin to routes in bus systems surrounding the area. Note that the buses purchased secondhand from Foothill Transit still display the uppercase "N" on their signs.

This table gives details for the routes that service Nassau County primarily. For details on routes that run into Nassau County but do not service it primarily, see:
List of bus routes in Queens: Q2, Q5, Q36, Q46, Q85, Q110, Q111, Q113, Q114
List of bus routes in Suffolk County, New York: S20, S33
List of express bus routes in New York City: QM6, QM36

Routes
Routes shown are for the full route except for branching. The n4, n6 and n40/41 provide service 24 hours a day; all other routes are daily service except late nights unless otherwise noted.
Roosevelt Field Mall note: All routes entering Roosevelt Field Mall from Old Country Road travel to/from points east via East Gate Boulevard, and to/from points west via Ring Road West.
Queens note: NICE routes to Jamaica and Flushing do not carry customers wholly within Queens except where noted.

Connections to New York City Subway stations at the bus routes' terminals are also listed where applicable.

Nassau Inter-County Express

n1 to n27

n31 to n88

Shuttles

The Elmont and Mercy Medical shuttles are resurrected former regular routes, with the Port Washington shuttle being a former MSBA shuttle. These shuttles are now serviced with passenger vans, and operate only during rush hours.

Current route history

City of Long Beach

The City of Long Beach operates five bus routes within the City and to Point Lookout, all originating from the Long Beach LIRR station. The fare is $2.25 unless otherwise noted and payable in cash (coins and $1 bills) only. MetroCard is not accepted.

The East Loop & West Loop were once operated by the Long Beach Railway company as trolley lines.

Service is available at all times except early Monday morning.

City of Glen Cove 
In addition to being served by the n21 and n27 bus routes, the City of Glen Cove also operates 2 services.
 Loop bus via Landing Road, Forest Avenue, Sea Cliff Avenue, and Glen Cove Avenue.
 Commuter bus to Glen Cove industrial park.

Village of North Hills 
The Village of North Hills operates a shuttle bus service between Village Hall and the Manhasset LIRR station for village residents.

Discontinued services
Note that discontinued services pre-NICE takeover are prefixed with an uppercase "N".

Note about the former Jones Beach routes: the original JB routes (except JB87 and JB88) were numbered from the local route which the Jones Beach-bound route traced starting from its non-Jones Beach terminal.

References

External links
Nassau Inter-County Express

Bus routes
Nassau County, New York